Irving Park is a city park of about  in northeast Portland, in the U.S. state of Oregon. Located at Northeast 7th Avenue and Fremont Street in the Irvington neighborhood, the park is on land that was originally owned by William Irving, for whom the neighborhood was named. The Irvington Racetrack once occupied part of the land.

Irving was a mid-19th century mariner who operated ships on the Columbia and Willamette rivers. Arriving in Oregon in 1849, he soon acquired a donation land claim. In 1858, he sold his steamship interests in Oregon and moved to British Columbia in Canada. His land claim, left to heirs, became the Irvington subdivision in 1887. Irving Street in Portland is also named for him.

Park amenities include fields for baseball, softball, and soccer; courts for basketball, tennis, and volleyball; paved paths, picnic tables, a playground, a horseshoe pit, and an off-leash area for dogs. The park is open daily from 5 a.m. to midnight. Hours for the off-leash area are from 5 to 10 a.m. and 6 p.m. to midnight from June 15 through September 1. From September 2 through June 14, off-leash hours are from 5 to 10 a.m. and 4 p.m. to midnight.

References

External links
 Park map showing off-leash area
Reservable picnic sites
Trees of Irving Park

1920 establishments in Oregon
Irvington, Portland, Oregon
Parks in Portland, Oregon
Protected areas established in 1920
Urban public parks